The 2017 BWF Para-Badminton World Championships was held from 22 to 26 December 2017 in Ulsan, South Korea.

Participating countries
264 athletes from 39 countries participated in this edition of Para-Badminton World Championships.

  (8)
  (1)
  (1)
  (1)
  (3)
  (18)
  (8)
  (3)
  (13)
  (2)
  (15)
  (11)
  (2)
  (1)
  (5)
  (25)
  (10)
  (3)
  (5)
  (28)
  (2)
  (5)
  (2)
  (1)
  (1)
  (4)
  (5)
  (11)
  (5)
  (18)
  (2)
  (2)
  (1)
  (4)
  (19)
  (1)
  (10)
  (2)
  (6)

Medalists

Men's event

Women's events

Mixed events

Medal table

References

BWF Para-Badminton World Championships
Para-Badminton World Championships
Para-Badminton BWF World Championships
International sports competitions hosted by South Korea